The Douglass-Truth Branch is a library building and Seattle Public Library branch in Seattle, Washington, United States. Named after Frederick Douglass and Sojourner Truth, the library houses the West Coast's largest collection of African-American literature and history.

Soul Pole was donated to the library by the Rotary Boys Club in 1972, and was restored in 2021 before reinstallation in 2022.

References

External links 

 

Seattle Public Library
Library buildings